Malu cu Flori is a commune in Dâmbovița County, Muntenia, Romania with a population of 2,675 people. It is composed of five villages: Capu Coastei, Copăceni, Malu cu Flori, Micloșanii Mari and Micloșanii Mici.

References

Communes in Dâmbovița County
Localities in Muntenia